Verna Manders (April 10, 1920 – April 1, 2010) was an American legislator, saleswoman, receptionist.

Born in Green Bay, Wisconsin, Manders worked as a saleswoman, receptionist, factory worker, crossing guard. In 1967, Manders was elected in a special election, to the Wisconsin State Assembly, to succeed her husband Adrian Manders, who died in office. Manders was elected as a Democrat from Milwaukee, Wisconsin. Manders died in Milwaukee.

Notes

1920 births
2010 deaths
Politicians from Green Bay, Wisconsin
Politicians from Milwaukee
Women state legislators in Wisconsin
Democratic Party members of the Wisconsin State Assembly
21st-century American women